National Secondary Route 158, or just Route 158 (or ) is a National Road Route of Costa Rica, located in the Guanacaste province.

Description
In Guanacaste province the route covers Nicoya canton (Mansión district), Hojancha canton (Hojancha, Puerto Carrillo, Matambú districts).

References

Highways in Costa Rica